William Edward Bann (15 August 1902 – 16 March 1973) was a Scottish professional footballer who played as a full back in the Football League for Tottenham Hotspur, Brentford, Bristol Rovers and Aldershot. He also played in the Scottish League for Broxburn United.

Career 
A full back, Bann's senior career began at Scottish League Second Division club Broxburn United. He moved to England to join First Division club Tottenham Hotspur in February 1923 and made 12 appearances before his release in May 1929. He was then re-signed, but failed to make any further appearances before departing White Hart Lane for the final time at the end of the 1929–30 season. Bann joined Third Division South club Brentford in June 1930 and made seven appearances before joining Bristol Rovers in 1932, where he made just a solitary league appearance. He finished his career with spells at Aldershot and Northfleet United.

Career statistics

References 

1902 births
1973 deaths
Scottish footballers
English Football League players
Broxburn United F.C. players
Tottenham Hotspur F.C. players
Brentford F.C. players
Bristol Rovers F.C. players
Aldershot F.C. players
Sportspeople from Broxburn, West Lothian
Footballers from West Lothian
Association football fullbacks
Scottish Football League players
Northfleet United F.C. players